Jonathan David Magonet (born 2 August 1942) is a  British rabbi theologian, Vice-President of the World Union for Progressive Judaism, and a biblical scholar. He is highly active in Christian-Jewish dialogue, and in dialogue between Jews and Muslims. He was the long-time Principal (Rector or academic director), now retired, of London's Leo Baeck College, the first Liberal Jewish seminary of all of Europe since World War II. He resides in London with his wife Dorothea.

Magonet served on the rabbinic staff at West London Synagogue of British Jews. He has been part of the team constructing the new edition of the British Reform Prayer Book.

Career
Magonet was a trustee of the Maimonides Foundation, a charitable organisation promoting dialogue between Jews and Muslims.

His 1992 book, Bible Lives, presented a series of pen portraits of figures from the Hebrew Bible, both major and (particularly) minor.  Originally written for the Jewish Chronicle, they aimed to show that the Bible could still be a 'living' source of deep insight into human character.  Magonet has described in the book's introduction the challenge of bringing to 'centre stage' characters like Shiphrah, Puah, Palti ben Laish and Ritzpah with only minimal information about them available from the text, and expressed the hope that readers would themselves go back to the texts to check out or challenge his interpretations.

Books
 A Rabbi Reads the Torah (2013) 
Talking to the Other: Jewish Interfaith Dialogue with Christians and Muslims (2003) 
A Rabbi reads the Psalms, SCM-Canterbury Press Limited (1994, 2004) 
A Rabbi Reads the Bible (1991, 2004) 
Bible Lives (1992). London: SCM

Articles
 "Jonah, Book Of" Anchor Bible Dictionary, 3:936-942

References

1942 births
Living people
20th-century English rabbis
21st-century English rabbis
British Reform rabbis
British Jewish writers
British Jewish theologians
People educated at Westminster School, London
English male non-fiction writers
People associated with Leo Baeck College
Rabbis from London